Hamāyūn (Homāyūn, Khamayun, همایون,) is a village in Kapisa Province of Afghanistan. Hamayun lies on the eastern slope of Mt. Nēshar.

Notes

Populated places in Kapisa Province